The United States Department of Defense acknowledges holding approximately one dozen Algerian detainees in Guantanamo.
However an Algerian government press release, on August 21, 2016, said that they had been tracking 28 Algerian captives. Both US and Algerian governments agreed just two captives remained in US custody.

A total of 778 detainees have been held in the Guantanamo Bay detention camps, in Cuba since the camps opened on January 11, 2002.

The camp population peaked in early 2004 at approximately 660 before numerous detainees were released. Only nineteen new captives, all "high value detainees," have been transferred there since the United States Supreme Court's ruling in Rasul v. Bush (2004), which said that detainees had the habeas corpus right to challenge their detention before an impartial tribunal. 

On March 3, 2008 an Algerian delegation visited Guantanamo. At that time DOD reported seventeen Algerian nationals remaining in Guantanamo.

Release negotiations
On June 23, 2008 the Algerian newspaper El Khabar quoted Farouk Ksentini, the head of Algeria's Advisory Human Rights Commission, about negotiations over the Guantanamo detainees' repatriation. According to Al Khabar, Ksentini reported that the US had insisted on unacceptable conditions unacceptable to Algeria for transfer of the detainees to their country of origin. The article stated that Sandra Hodgkinson, Deputy Assistant Secretary of Defense for Detainee Affairs, had not been telling "the entire truth".

The Department of Defense announced on July 2, 2008 that it had repatriated two Algerians. The Department withheld the Algerians' identities without explanation.

On July 3, 2008 Carol Rosenberg of the Miami Herald reported that the two repatriated Algerians were Mustafa Hamlily and Abdul Raham Hourari.

The Department of Defense announced on August 30, 2013 that it had repatriated two additional Algerians, who were identified as Nabil Hadjarab and Mutij Sayyab. This would bring the total number of remaining detainees at Guantanamo to 164.

Algerian detainees in Guantanamo

Algerian Six
Guantanamo also contains six citizens of Bosnia and Herzegovina who were born in Algeria, who are known as the
"Algerian Six".

Repatriation
The Department of Defense has acknowledged repatriating seven Algerians:
Abdul Raham Houari, 
Mohammed Abd Al Al Qadir,
Sameur Abdenour,
Mustafa Ahmed Hamlily,
Fethi Boucetta,
Mammar Ameur, and
Soufian Abar Huwari.

The Department of Defense didn't reveal the men's names.

On April 3, 2009, at the G20 Summit in Strausburg, French President Nicolai Sarkozy indicated France would offer asylum to a former Guantanamo detainee.

References

External links
Two Algerian Torture Victims Are Freed from Guantánamo Andy Worthington 25.1.2010

UN experts warn against sending detainees at torture-risk
Obama and US Courts Repatriate Algerian from Guantánamo Against His Will; May Be Complicit in Torture Andy Worthington 21.7.2010

Lists of Guantanamo Bay detainees by nationality
Algeria–United States relations